Gopannapalem is a village in Eluru district of the Indian state of Andhra Pradesh. It is located on the north side of district headquarters Eluru at a distance of 06 km. It is under of Eluru revenue division. The nearest train station is Powerpet (PRH) located at a distance of 2.13 Km.

Demographics 

 Census of India, Gopannapalem has population of 1722 of which 886 are males while 836 are females.  Average Sex Ratio of Gopannapalem village is 944. Population of children with age 0-6 is 172 which makes up 10.02% of total population of village. Literacy rate of Gopannapalem village was 74%.

References

Villages in Eluru district